Battye is a surname, a variant of Batty. Notable people with the surname include:

 Colin Battye (1936–2018), rugby league footballer
 Don Battye (1938–2016), composer
 Ian Battye (1952–2007), rugby league footballer
 James Battye (1871–1954), librarian
 John Battye (1926–2016), football player
 Malcolm Battye (born 1941), rugby league footballer
 Margaret Battye (1909–1949), lawyer
 Neil Battye (born 1963), rugby league footballer

See also
 Aubyn Trevor-Battye (1855–1922), traveller and naturalist
 J S Battye Library
 Battye Glacier, Mac. Robertson Land, Antarctica

English-language surnames
Patronymic surnames